Song of the Sea is a 1952 Brazilian drama film directed by Alberto Cavalcanti and starring Luiz Andrade. It was entered into the 1954 Cannes Film Festival.
Its poetic realist style incorporates elements of documentary and melodrama. The film depicts the migration of families away from drought in the north east of Brazil and their struggle for survival.

Cast
 Luiz Andrade
 Glauce Bandeira
 Fernando Becker
 Débora Borba
 Margarida Cardoso
 Ernani Dantas
 Alfredo de Oliveira
 Aurora Duarte
 Cacilda Lanuza
 Antônio Martinelli
 Miriam Nunes
 Ruy Saraiva
 Alberto Vilar
 Maria do Carmo Xavier

References

External links

1952 films
1952 drama films
Brazilian drama films
1950s Portuguese-language films
Brazilian black-and-white films
Films directed by Alberto Cavalcanti